The Gambia Girl Guides Association (GGGA) is the national Guiding organization of the Gambia. It serves 9,371 members (as of 2003). Founded in 1923, the girls-only organization became a full member of the World Association of Girl Guides and Girl Scouts in 1966.

See also
The Gambia Scout Association

References 

World Association of Girl Guides and Girl Scouts member organizations
Scouting and Guiding in the Gambia

Youth organizations established in 1923